The Taegwalli Line is a non-electrified railway line of the Korean State Railway in Taegwan County, North P'yŏngan Province, North Korea, running from Sinon on the P'yŏngbuk Line to Taegwalli Station, a private station for Workers' Party of Korea officials.

Route 

A yellow background in the "Distance" box indicates that section of the line is not electrified.

References

Railway lines in North Korea
Standard gauge railways in North Korea